Hypsopygia ochreicilia is a species of snout moth in the genus Hypsopygia. It was described by George Hampson in 1891 and is known from India and Taiwan.

References

Moths described in 1891
Pyralini